Urophora solstitialis is a species of tephritid or fruit flies in the genus Urophora of the family Tephritidae.

Distribution
Britain, Scandinavia & Kazakhstan France, Italy, Balkans & Iran; Introduced to North America, Australia, New Zealand

References

Urophora
Insects described in 1758
Diptera of Asia
Diptera of Europe
Taxa named by Carl Linnaeus